Tetraglenes diuroides is a species of beetle in the family Cerambycidae. It was described by Ritsema in 1885.

References

Agapanthiini
Beetles described in 1885